This is a list of Detroit Tigers single-season, career, and other team records.

Single season records

Strikeouts in one game: 17 Aníbal Sánchez  (2013)

Career records

Tigers hitting for the cycle
 Bobby Veach, September 17, 1920 
 Bob Fothergill, September 26, 1926 
 Gee Walker, April 20, 1937 
 Charlie Gehringer, May 27, 1939 
 Vic Wertz, September 14, 1947 
 George Kell, June 2, 1950 
 Hoot Evers, September 7, 1950 
 Travis Fryman, July 28, 1993 
 Damion Easley, June 8, 2001 
 Carlos Guillén, August 1, 2006

Sortable batting statistics of Detroit Tigers batters with 1500+ at bats current through 2014 season

Note: G = Games played; P = Position; AB = At bats; R = Runs; H = Hits; 2B = Doubles; 3B = Triples; HR = Home runs; RBI = Runs batted in; BB= Bases on balls; SO = Strikeouts; SB = Stolen bases; Avg. = Batting average; OBP = On base percentage; Slg. = Slugging percentage

Sortable pitching statistics of Detroit Tigers pitchers with 200+ games or 750+ innings

Note: W = Wins; L = Losses; PCT = Win percentage; ERA = Earned run average; G = Games; GS = Games started; CG = Complete games; SHO = Shutouts; SV = Saves; IP = Innings pitched; HR = Home runs allowed; HBP = Hit by pitch; BB = Bases on balls; SO = Strikeouts

See also
Detroit Tigers award winners and league leaders

Records
Major League Baseball team records